Fondis is an unincorporated community in Elbert County, in the U.S. state of Colorado.

History
A post office called Fondis was established in 1895, and remained in operation until 1954. Ella Cox was the town's first postmaster. One historical account states that the unincorporated town derived its name from Fondi, in Italy, while other accounts state that it is named for an Italian Hotel, the Fondide Italia. Around the turn of the twentieth century, the town had a population of 40 people and boasted several stores, including Harper's General Store operated by George Conarroe, two blacksmith shops and the Fondis Hotel, owned and operated by Will Conarroe. He also operated a cheese factory that turned out 250 pounds of cheese per day. For 10 weeks in 1902, Fred A. Coan operated the Fondis Herald newspaper.

References

Unincorporated communities in Elbert County, Colorado
Unincorporated communities in Colorado